is a 2014 Japanese autobiographical film directed by Kazuo Umezu. Ainosuke Kataoka plays the role of Umezu.

Cast
Ainosuke Kataoka as Kazuo Umezu
Kimie Shingyōji as Ichie

References

External links

2014 films
Autobiographies
Biographical films about artists
2010s biographical films
Japanese biographical films
Kazuo Umezu
2014 directorial debut films
2010s Japanese films